Suleiman is a name.
Suleiman may also refer to:

Places 
Sleman Regency, Indonesia
Suleiman Mountains, Afghanistan and Pakistan
Suleiman Bridge, a bridge in Osijek
Suleiman Courts, high-rise apartment building in Kuala Lumpur, Malaysia
Suleiman Mosque
Suleiman Mosque (Rhodes)

Animals 
Suleiman (elephant), an elephant named after Suleiman the Magnificent
 Suleiman (horse)

Other uses 
Süleyman (Trinity Blood character), a fictional character in the anime series Trinity Blood

See also 
Sleiman
Slimane
Soliman (disambiguation)
Solomon
Sulaiman (disambiguation)
Suleman (disambiguation)
Sulejman
Sulayman
Suleyman
Süleymanoğlu
Sulliman
Islamic view of Solomon
Suleimani (disambiguation)